The Institute for Austrian Historic Research (acronym IÖG) is a history research institution in Vienna, Austria. Established in 1854, since 2016 it is part of the University of Vienna.

Publications 
Since 1880 the institute publishes the famous journal Mitteilungen des Instituts für Österreichische Geschichtsforschung (MIÖG).

Bibliography 
 Alphons Lhotsky: Geschichte des Instituts für Österreichische Geschichtsforschung 1854–1954 (= Mitteilungen des Instituts für Österreichische Geschichtsforschung. Ergänzungsband 17). Böhlau, Graz / Köln 1954.
 Manfred Stoy: Das Österreichische Institut für Geschichtsforschung 1929–1945 (= Mitteilungen des Instituts für Österreichische Geschichtsforschung. Ergänzungsband 50). Oldenbourg, München 2007, ISBN 978-3-7029-0551-4.
 Karin Winter und Jakob Wührer: Der Kurs ist tot! Es lebe das Masterstudium! Ein Erfahrungsbericht zur archivwissenschaftlichen Ausbildung an der Universität Wien und dem Institut für Österreichischen Geschichtsforschung, in: Scrinium 66 (2012), S. 65–107 (Der Beitrag bringt als Anhang die jüngsten Entwicklungen in der Studienordnung des Masterstudiums).
 Ernst Zehetbauer: Geschichtsforschung und Archivwissenschaft. Das Institut für Österreichische Geschichtsforschung und die wissenschaftliche Ausbildung der Archivare in Österreich. tredition, Hamburg 2014, ISBN 978-3-8495-7660-8.
 Ernst Zehetbauer: Ganz neue Kleider. Achtes Kapitel zum Werk: Geschichtsforschung und Archivwissenschaft. Das Institut für Österreichische Geschichtsforschung und die wissenschaftliche Ausbildung der Archivare in Österreich. tredition, Hamburg 2017, ISBN 978-3-7439-2269-3.

References

External links 
 Website

University of Vienna
Innere Stadt
Organizations established in 1854
1854 establishments in the Austrian Empire
Organisations based in Vienna
Research institutes in Austria
History institutes